Anthene hobleyi, the Hobley's hairtail, is a butterfly in the family Lycaenidae. It is found in the Democratic Republic of the Congo, Uganda, Kenya, Tanzania, north-eastern Zambia and possibly Rwanda and Burundi. The habitat consists of semi-montane and montane forests.

Subspecies
A. h. hobleyi (central Kenya)
A. h. elgonensis (Aurivillius, 1925) (eastern Uganda, western Kenya)
A. h. kigezi Stempffer, 1961 (Democratic Republic of the Congo: north-east to North Kivu and possibly Shaba, Uganda (south-east), possibly Rwanda and Burundi)
A. h. teita Stempffer, 1961 (Kenya: south-east to the Teita Hills)
A. h. ufipa Kielland, 1990 (Tanzania: Ufipa, Usambara and Kigoma regions)

References

Butterflies described in 1904
Anthene